Araeosoma violaceum is a species of sea urchin of the family Echinothuriidae. Its armour is covered with spines. It is placed in the genus Araeosoma and lives in the sea. A. violaceum was first scientifically described in 1903 by Ole Theodor Jensen Mortensen.

See also 
 Araeosoma tessellatum
 Araeosoma thetidis
 Arbacia crassispina

References 

violaceum
Animals described in 1903
Taxa named by Ole Theodor Jensen Mortensen